Sarah Casada (born September 29, 1936) is an American politician who served in the Washington House of Representatives from the 25th district from 1991 to 1997 and from 2001 to 2003.

References

1936 births
Living people
Republican Party members of the Washington House of Representatives
Pierce County Councillors
Women state legislators in Washington (state)